Granzyme K (GrK) is a protein that is encoded by the GZMK gene on chromosome 5 in humans. Granzymes are a family of serine proteases which have various intracellular and extracellular roles. GrK is found in granules of natural killer (NK) cells and cytotoxic T lymphocytes (CTLs), and is traditionally described as being cytotoxic towards targeted foreign, infected, or cancerous cells. NK cells and CTLs can induce apoptosis through the granule secretory pathway, which involves the secretion of granzymes along with perforin at immunological synapses.

Intracellularly, GrK may cleave a variety of substrates, such as the nucleosome assembly protein (NAP), HMG2, and Ape1 in the ER-associated SET complex, along with other targets that have downstream cytotoxic effects. Compared to in vitro studies of GrK cytotoxicity in rats and humans, in vitro mouse studies show no cytotoxic potential in the absence of perforin, making the role of GrK controversial. In vitro studies show potential extracellular targets for GrK such as the cleavage and activation of protease activated receptors (PAR)-1 and PAR-2. Grk binds lipopolysaccharides (LPS) in vitro separately from GrK's catalytic activity. Both PAR and LPS activation by GrK induce cytokine production in human in vitro studies.

GrK is important in bacterial and viral infection control. GrK-expressing CD8+ T cells may be associated with inflammation and aging.

References

Further reading